This is a list of Parliamentary Under-Secretaries of State and Permanent Under-Secretaries of State at the India Office during the period of British rule between 1858 and 1937 for India(and Burma by extension), and for India and Burma from 1937 to 1948.

The Parliamentary Under-Secretary of State was a ministerial position and the Permanent Under-Secretary of State was a civil service position.

Parliamentary Under-Secretaries of State for India, 1858–1937

Parliamentary Under-Secretaries of State for India and Burma, 1937–1948

Permanent Under-Secretaries of State for India, 1858–1937

Permanent Under-Secretaries of State for India and Burma, 1937–1948

See also 
Secretary of State for India

Government of British India
India
Defunct ministerial offices in the United Kingdom
India Office people
Foreign Office during World War II